Curtis Crockett (October 18, 1940 – February 1, 2003) was an American football player and coach. He served as the head football coach at Clark Atlanta University from 1999 to 2001, compiling a record  of 8–17. Crockett was appointed interim head coach four games into the 1999 season when head coach Elmer Mixon resigned after an 0–4 start. He resigned eight games into the 2001 season after leading the team to 1–7 record. Clark Atlanta's athletic director Brenda Edmond gave Crockett the option of being fired or resigning.

Crockett played for one season for the Baltimore Broncos of the Atlantic Coast Football League. He died of cancer on February 1, 2003, at Crawford Long Hospital in Atlanta, Georgia.

Head coaching record

Notes

References

1940 births
2003 deaths
American football defensive ends
American male discus throwers
American male shot putters
Atlantic Coast Football League players
Clark Atlanta Panthers football coaches
Clark Atlanta Panthers football players
Clark Atlanta Panthers men's basketball players
College men's track and field athletes in the United States
People from McDonough, Georgia
African-American coaches of American football
African-American players of American football
African-American basketball players
African-American male track and field athletes
Deaths from cancer in Georgia (U.S. state)
20th-century African-American sportspeople
21st-century African-American people